Alexandra Davies-Jones (born 5 April 1989) is a Welsh politician serving as Member of Parliament (MP) for Pontypridd since 2019. A member of the Labour Party, she is Shadow Minister for Digital, Culture, Media and Sport.

Early life and education
Davies was born in Church Village in South Wales. She is the daughter of a miner, stating that she was "brought up on the values of socialism". She attended Tonyrefail Primary School, Tonyrefail Comprehensive School and graduated from Cardiff University with a joint honours degree in Law and Politics.

Career
Davies-Jones was a youth representative for the Labour Party, Co-operative Party, and the trade union Unite the Union.

She began her career a researcher in the House of Commons and the National Assembly for Wales. Davies-Jones was a Regional Development Consultant for the Electoral Reform Society from 2010 to 2011. She then worked as a communications and press officer for Wales and the West Midlands at the Royal Institute of Chartered Surveyors from 2013 to 2015. She worked for the non-profit Dwr Cymru Welsh Water as a regional communications director and then a community engagement manager from 2015 to 2019.

Davies-Jones was elected as a councillor for Tonyrefail Community Council in 2012, at the age of 23, and for Rhondda Cynon Taf Council in 2017.

Davies-Jones was elected as MP for Pontypridd at the 2019 United Kingdom general election. She successfully retained the seat for the Labour Party, albeit with the vote share falling by nearly 11 percentage points since the previous election in 2017. She is the first female MP to represent Pontrypridd its creation in 1918.

Davies-Jones has chosen to retain her positions as county borough councillor for the ward of Tonyrefail West and as community councillor for Tonyrefail Community Council, in addition to her role as a Member of Parliament.

She is a member of the Chartered Institute of Public Relations.

On 24 January 2023, Commons Standards Commissioner Daniel Greenberg launched an inquiry into whether Davies-Jones broke the MPs' Code of Conduct with "paid advocacy". She had taken a trip to Tokyo, valued at nearly £3,000 and paid for by the British Council, the previous Autumn.

Personal life
Davies-Jones has two stepsons, Blake and Kieran, and a son, Sullivan, with her husband, Andrew, whom she married in 2014. In January 2021, Davies-Jones talked to BBC News about her experiences of cervical cancer.

She lists her recreations in Who's Who as "theatre, singing, family, sport, travel".

References

External links 
 
 Twitter
 LinkedIn

Living people
21st-century British women politicians
Alumni of Cardiff University
Female members of the Parliament of the United Kingdom for Welsh constituencies
People from Tonyrefail
UK MPs 2019–present
Welsh Labour councillors
Welsh Labour Party MPs
Welsh socialists
1989 births